The 2013 Morehead State Eagles football team represented Morehead State University in the 2013 NCAA Division I FCS football season. They were led by first-year head coach Rob Tenyer and played their home games at Jayne Stadium. They were a member of the Pioneer Football League. They finished the season 3–9, 3–5 in PFL play to finish in seventh place.

Schedule

References

Morehead State
Morehead State Eagles football seasons
Morehead State Eagles football